A charlotte is a type of bread pudding that can be served hot or cold. It is also referred to as an "icebox cake". Bread, sponge cake, crumbs or biscuits/cookies are used to line a mold, which is then filled with a fruit puree or custard. The baked pudding could then be sprinkled with powdered sugar and glazed with a salamander, a red-hot iron plate attached to a long handle, though modern recipes would likely use more practical tools to achieve a similar effect.

The variant Charlotte russe (Russian Charlotte) uses a mold lined with ladyfingers and filled with Bavarian cream.

Classically, stale bread dipped in butter was used as the lining, but sponge cake or ladyfingers may be used today. The filling may be covered with a thin layer of similarly flavoured gelatin.

History
The charlotte has been invented in the early nineteenth century. Some say it was then a tribute to the wife of George III, Queen Charlotte, grandmother of Queen Victoria.

In 1815, Marie-Antoine Carême claims to have thought of charlotte à la parisienne "", presumably in 1803, when he opened his own pastry shop.

The earliest known English recipe is from the 1808 London edition of Maria Rundell's New System of Domestic Cookery:
Cut as many very thin slices of white bread as will cover the bottom and line the sides of a baking dish, but first rub it thick with butter. Put apples, in thin slices, into the dish, in layers, till full, strewing sugar between, and bits of butter. In the mean time, soak as many thin slices of bread as will cover the whole, in warm milk, over which lay a plate, and a weight to keep the bread close on the apples. Bake slowly three hours. To a middling sized dish use half a pound of butter in the whole.

In Carême's 1815 Le Pâtissier royal parisien, he mentions many varieties of charlotte: ; he mentions  as the name used by others for what he called .

Types
There are many variants. Most charlottes are served cool, so they are more common in warmer seasons. Fruit charlottes usually combine a fruit purée or preserve, like raspberry or pear, with a custard filling or whipped cream. Charlottes are not always made with fruit; some, notably charlotte russe, use custard or Bavarian cream, and a chocolate charlotte is made with layers of chocolate mousse filling. 

The Algerian charlotte is made with honey, dates, orange rind, and almonds.

The 19th-century Russian sharlotka is a baked pudding with layers of brown bread and apple sauce, and has since evolved into a simple dessert of chopped apples basked in a sweet batter.

Charlotte russe

A simplified version of charlotte russe was a popular dessert or on-the-go treat sold in candy stores and luncheonettes in New York City, during the 1930s, 1940s, and 1950s. It consisted of a paper cup filled with yellow cake and whipped cream topped with half a maraschino cherry. The bottom of the cup is pushed up to eat.

Charlotte royale is made with the same filling as a Charlotte russe, but the ladyfingers are replaced by slices of Swiss roll.

Etymology
The earliest attestation of "charlotte" is in a New York magazine in 1796. Its origins are unclear. It may come from the woman's name. One etymology suggests it is a corruption of the Old English word , a kind of custard, or charlets, a meat dish.

It is often claimed that Carême named it charlotte after one of the various foreign royals he served, but the name appears years earlier.

See also

 Apple cake
 Applesauce cake
 Baking
 Crema de fruta
 Crumble
 Icebox cake
 List of French desserts
 List of Russian desserts
 Summer pudding
 Tiramisu

References

External links

Custard desserts
British desserts
French desserts
Russian desserts
Tarts
French cakes
No bake cakes
Fruit dishes
Layer cakes